Mount Burman is a rounded mountain on Vancouver Island, British Columbia, Canada, located  southeast of Gold River, south of Golden Hinde and west of Schjelderup Lake.

See also
List of mountains in Canada

References

Burman, Mount
One-thousanders of British Columbia
Nootka Land District